Singapore FA was a representative team of footballers representing the Football Association of Singapore in domestic competitions run by the Football Association of Malaysia. This is separate from the Singapore national team. As it permits overseas players to play, it is a club side (top level domestic football in Malaysia has traditionally been played by representative sides of state football associations). Despite dissolving in 1994, it is still by far the second most successful team in Malaysia with 27 honours (only surpassed by its rival Selangor). Its derby with Selangor is known as the most North-South Rivalry.

History

Pre-War to 1970s
The Singapore Amateur Football Association had participated in the Malayan (Malaysian) Cup since its inauguration in 1921 with a representative side. During the pre-war years, Singapore and Selangor were a dominant force and fierce rivals, winning the Cup 19 times between them. The post war years were also dominated by Singapore and Selangor up till 1970, where Selangor emerged as the dominant force in the Malaysia Cup with eleven Cup wins, compared to two victories by Singapore. However, the excitement of Cup during the 1970s attracted a full house at every Cup match played at the National Stadium. Fans often nicknamed the Singapore team "The Lions" since this period.

The 1980s
Due to changes in the Malaysia Cup format in 1982, all teams participating in the Malaysia Cup now had to qualify by finishing within the top 8 positions in the Malaysian Semi-Pro Football League, instead of gaining direct entry to the Cup as before.  The Lions had participated in the Malaysian Semi-Pro Football League since its inauguration.

During this period Pahang, Kuala Lumpur, Kedah and Johor had emerged as serious contenders to the cup besides Selangor F.C.. However, the Lions were not serious challengers in either the League or the Cup. They had only won the League once in 1985, failed to qualify for the Malaysian Cup on many occasions or being knocked out of the Cup in the early stages. This was not helped by the fact that other teams within the League (KL, Pahang and Kedah) managed to sign key Singapore players like Fandi Ahmad, Malek Awab, K. Kannan and V. Sundramoorthy to boost their teams.

The 1990s
The emergence of several young players like Nazri Nasir, Hasnim Haron, D. Tokijan, Borhan Abu Samah and the potent partnership and free scoring of both Australian imports Abbas Saad and Alistair Edwards resulted to a strong finishing in the league and cup, by finishing runners up to Selangor in the Semi-Pro League 1 and runners up in the Cup final in 1990.

Many fans expected the team to build on the success of 1990 in the following season but the failure to retain the services of players like Borhan Abu Samah, Abbas Saad and Alistair Edwards proved to be costly. The team did not qualify for the Malaysian Cup and was fighting to avoid relegation to Semi-Pro League 2 in 1991. Worse was to follow when the team was finally relegated to Semi-Pro League 2 after a very inconsistent and poor performances throughout the 1992 season.

Relegation proved to be the turning point for the Lions with a complete shake up of the team in 1993. Top local and key import players like Fandi, Malek, Kannan, Sundram, Jang Jung, Abbas Saad and Alistair Edwards, who were then playing for Malaysian teams all returning to help the Lions in their mission to regain their status in Semi-Pro League 1 and at the same time, mount a serious challenge to the Cup through qualification by finishing as one of the top two teams in League 2. This team, dubbed as the "Dream Team" did achieve its primary targets of promotion to Semi-Pro League 1 and mount a serious challenge to the Cup. However, the trophies still eluded them as this team finished second to Selangor in League 2 and runners up again to Kedah in the Cup.

Despite failure at the last hurdle in 1993, the Lions retained the services of key players like Abbas, Jang Jung, Malek and at the same time, introduced up and coming players like Steven Tan, Lee Man Hon and V. Selvaraj for the following season.

With the right mix of experienced pros, young players and expert tactician in former Aston Villa/New Zealand defender Douglas Moore, this team won the M-League and Cup double in 1994. The league was won after a long and hard battle with Kedah where both teams swapped top positions throughout the season with the key moment was the 2:0 win against Kedah in Kallang that finally sealed the title for the Lions.  The Malaysia Cup was won with an emphatic 4:0 victory over Pahang at Shah Alam Stadium, with Abbas Saad scoring a hat-trick and Fandi rounding off the score.

However, at the height of winning the Cup, FAS had decided to withdraw the Lions from Malaysian competitions after the 1994 season following a dispute with the Football Association of Malaysia over gate receipts and concentrate its efforts on the development of local football. A significant consequence of this would have seen the bulk of the Singapore national team be without regular domestic football for a year, as it was estimated to take that long to put in place the structure of what would eventually become the S.League. So, the FAS decided to enter a team based around the Lions team in the FAS Premier League, which was then the top level of domestic football in Singapore, for the 1995 season, that would enable the national team squad to get regular games without having to find other clubs. This team went undefeated during the season, easily winning the last FAS Premier League title.

2010s
In 2011, the Football Association of Singapore and the Football Association of Malaysia reached an agreement that would see greater co-operation between the two nations. One of the intended avenues will see Young Lions play in the Malaysian Super League and Malaysia Cup from 2012 onwards, the first time a Singaporean team has participated in Malaysian domestic football since Singapore won the 1994 M-League and Malaysia Cup double. Although the new Singapore team will have the existing Young Lions set up at its core, the squad will be permitted up to five local players over the age of 23, as well as a number of overseas players in accordance with the quota set out by the rules of the Malaysian competitions the team will play in.

The new team was named as LionsXII as relation to Singapore FA.

Seasons

Malaysia Cup
The preliminary group phase from 1921 to 1978, and the preliminary league phase from 1979 to 1988 was considered part of the Malaysia Cup proper and not as a stand-alone competition.

 From 1921 to 1950, the winners of the Northern and Southern sections play-off in the final.
 The Cup was shared between finalists Singapore and Selangor in 1928 and 1929.
 An Eastern zone was added from 1951.

Semi-professional era
The Semi-Professional League, with two divisions, was inaugurated in 1989. The two divisions were merged into the Premier League in 1994.

Key

P = Played
W = Games won
D = Games drawn
L = Games lost
F = Goals for
A = Goals against
Pts = Points
Pos = Final position

MC-N = Malaysia Cup Northern Section/Zone
MC-S = Malaysia Cup Southern Section/Zone
MC = Malaysia Cup League Stage
SP1 = Semi-Pro League Division One
SP2 = Semi-Pro League Division Two
PL = Malaysia Premier League

QF = Quarter-finals
SF = Semi-finals

References:

Honours
 Malaysia Cup: 24
 1921, 1923, 1924, 1925, 1928 (shared), 1929 (shared), 1930, 1932, 1933, 1934, 1937, 1939, 1940, 1941, 1950, 1951, 1952, 1955, 1960, 1964, 1965, 1977, 1980, 1994
 Malaysia League/ Malaysia Premier League: 2
 1985, 1994
 Sultan Haji Ahmad Shah Cup: 1
 1989
 FAM Cup Winners (Tier 3): 2
 1963, 1967
 FAS Premier League (semi-pro): 1
 1995

See also
 LionsXII

References

External links
 Drinks, keropok, kuaci: Malek Awab on the last time ever we saw the cup

 
Football in Singapore
Football clubs in Singapore
Football clubs in Malaysia
Defunct football clubs in Malaysia
Expatriated football clubs
Malaysia Cup winners
1921 establishments in Singapore
1995 disestablishments in Singapore